Savita Bhabhi is a pornographic cartoon character, a housewife, published by Kirtu. Her promiscuous behaviour is justified by Ashok, her husband. The title bhabhi (sister-in-law) is a respectful term for North Indian housewives. The character was promoted through a comic strip medium by anonymous activists in India. It has since been converted into a subscription-based strip.

History
The character proved controversial in India as soon as it was introduced in 2008 (March 29), due to conservatism present in Indian society. Some critics felt it represented the face of India's new ultra-liberal section.

The Savita Bhabhi film was released in May 2013; it deals with the subject of internet censorship in a humorous way with Savita Bhabhi as the heroine who saves the day.

Popularity 
According to BuzzFeed India, Savita Bhabhi is popular due to:
 It is very sexy to see an Indian woman unapologetically going after pleasure within a society which constantly shames women for the pursuit of pleasure.
 She fits the stereotypes of an Indian bhabhi, but she also breaks those stereotypes by indulging in her lust.
 Though she is depicted as an upper-class woman, she pursues sexual relationships with multiple people irrespective of their caste, class or gender.

Controversies

Production of pornography is broadly illegal in India. As a result, the original website was censored by the Indian government under its anti-pornography laws. This was met with criticism from the likes of Indian libertarian blogger and journalist Amit Varma. Eventually, mainstream media columnists joined in criticizing the ban as reflecting a "meddlesome, patriarchal mindset" of a "Net Nanny" government. This resulted in an online movement to save the character from being destroyed.

Initially the creators of the site chose to remain anonymous, going under the assumed collective name Indian Porn Empire. However, in 2009, the creator of the site Puneet Agarwal, a second generation Indian living in the UK revealed his identity in an attempt to fight against the ban. However a month later, due to family pressure he announced his decision to take down the comic strip.

The presence of a character bearing a resemblance to Bollywood actor Amitabh Bachchan was also met with criticism on Indian television channels.

Adaptations

The producers of the 2011 Indian comedy film, titled Sheetal Bhabhi.com, have claimed that it draws inspiration from Savita Bhabhi.
Savita Bhabhi, a film based on the character was released in 2013 by Kirtu.
Sai Tamhankar plays a character based on Savita Bhabhi in Alok Rajwade’s 2020 Indian Marathi-language film Ashleel Udyog Mitra Mandal.
 Savita Bhabhi Videos - In 2022, the team behind the original comics (Kirtu) has launched a new series where they revamped the original cartoons into semi-animated videos with Hindi dubbing.

See also 
 Pornography in India
 Censorship in India
 Pornography laws by region

References

External links 
 
 

Censorship in India
MILF pornography
Erotic comics
Indian pornography
Indian comics
Comics characters introduced in 2008
2008 comics debuts
Indian comics titles
Indian comics characters